The Ireland women's national volleyball team represents Ireland in international women's volleyball senior competitions and friendly matches.

As of 2020, Ireland also features a U17 national volleyball team which is coached by Jenny King and whose team captain is Maria Jones.

References

External links
 Volleyball Association of Ireland
Volleyball Ireland

National women's volleyball teams
Volleyball
Volleyball in Ireland